Now That's What I Call Reggae or Now Reggae is a triple-disc compilation album released in the United Kingdom on 25 June 2012.

Track listing

CD 1
Shaggy featuring Ricardo "RikRok" Ducent – It Wasn't Me
UB40 – Red Red Wine
Aswad – Don't Turn Around
Chaka Demus & Pliers featuring Jack Radics & Taxi Gang – Twist and Shout
Kevin Lyttle – Turn Me On
Althea & Donna – Uptown Top Ranking
Bob Marley & The Wailers – Sun Is Shining
Pato Banton featuring Ali & Robin Campbell – Baby Come Back
Inner Circle – Sweat (A La La La La Long) (song incorrectly labelled as Sweat (A La La La La Song) on CD release)
Eddy Grant – Gimme Hope Jo'anna
Peter Andre featuring Bubbler Ranx – Mysterious Girl
Ken Boothe – Everything I Own
Maxi Priest – Wild World
Gyptian – Hold You
Black Slate – Amigo
The Police – Walking on the Moon
Dave & Ansell Collins – Double Barrel
Musical Youth – Pass the Dutchie
Desmond Dekker – You Can Get It If You Really Want
Steel Pulse – Ku Klux Klan

CD 2
C.J. Lewis – Sweets for My Sweet
Big Mountain – Baby, I Love Your Way
Shabba Ranks & Chevelle Franklin – Mr. Loverman
Bobby McFerrin – Don't Worry, Be Happy
Maxi Priest – Close To You
Desmond Dekker – Israelites
UB40 – (I Can't Help) Falling In Love With You
Shinehead – Jamaican In New York
Dawn Penn – You Don't Love Me (No, No, No)
Janet Kay – Silly Games
Junior Murvin – Police & Thieves
Red Dragon featuring Brian & Tony Gold – Compliments on Your Kiss
Barry Biggs – Sideshow
Harry J Allstars – The Liquidator
John Holt – Help Me Make It Through The Night
Sugar Minott – We've Got a Good Thing Going
Ini Kamoze – Here Comes the Hotstepper
Diana King – Shy Guy
Susan Cadogan – Hurt So Good
Wayne Wade – Lady

CD 3
Sean Kingston – Beautiful Girls
Shaggy – Boombastic
Apache Indian – Boom Shack-a-Lak
Grace Jones featuring Bounty Killer – My Jamaican Guy
Aswad – Shine
Johnny Nash – I Can See Clearly Now
Gregory Isaacs – Night Nurse
Sophia George – Girlie Girlie
Chaka Demus & Pliers – Tease Me
Blue Lagoon – Break My Stride
Eddy Grant – I Don't Wanna Dance
Bob & Marcia – Young, Gifted and Black
The Pioneers – Let Your Yeah Be Yeah
Dandy Livingston – Suzanne, Beware of the Devil
Boris Gardiner – I Wanna Wake Up with You
Johnny Nash – Stir It Up
Jimmy Cliff – Wonderful World, Beautiful People
Chaka Demus & Pliers – She Don't Let Nobody
Greyhound – Black & White
Nicky Thomas – Love of the Common People

Charts

Release history

References

External links 
 Now That's What I Call Reggae

2012 compilation albums
Reggae
Sony Music compilation albums
EMI Records compilation albums
Universal Music Group compilation albums
Warner Music Group compilation albums
Reggae compilation albums